Herbert Stephen Irons (19 January 1834 – 29 June 1905), was an English Organist. He also wrote hymns including the tune "Southwell".

Career

He was born in Canterbury, where he became a chorister at the cathedral. He was an organ pupil of Dr. Stephen Elvey at Oxford.

He was 
Organist of St. Columba's College, Rathfarnham 1856 - 1857,
Organist of Southwell Minster 1857 - 1872
Assistant Organist of Chester Cathedral 1873 - 1876
Organist of St. Andrew's Church, Nottingham 1876 - 1905

References

Cathedral organists
1834 births
1905 deaths
People from Canterbury
19th-century classical musicians
19th-century organists